Castle Park View is a 26-storey high-rise in Bristol, England. Set for completion in 2022, the development occupies the site of the former Central Ambulance Station at the corner of Castle Street and Tower Hill and was proposed in 2017, with work starting in 2019. Designed by Chapman Taylor, the development contains 375 apartments and is the tallest building in Bristol at a height of 98m.

History 

The development sits on the site of the old wall of Bristol Castle; prior to construction commencing, an archaeological dig was commissioned to locate a dry ditch between the castle site and river. During the excavation of the site, a historic wall was discovered dating back to the circa 17th century, however, it was deemed to be of no significant interest so works continued.

Construction started in 2019 with the development topping out in November 2020. The first homes were completed in April 2021 with full completion set for 2022.

Architecture
The development forms part of an emerging tall building cluster around Castle Park. The 26 storey tower is one of five blocks and is clad in an offsite pre-fabricated façade system that consists of Moca Creme stone, inset clay bricks, window panels and spandrel panels. The design of the tower called for fritted, black painted, laminated glass spandrel panels for the façade, however, revised Building Regulations following the Grenfell Tower Fire relating to fire safety resulted in a design change during construction, to opaque, powder-coated aluminum sheets. The tower itself is crowned with a 6-metre constellation.
.

Castle Park View is the first commercial connection to the Bristol district heating Network, Bristol City Council's own network of pipes providing low-carbon heat to businesses and homes across the city.

See also
List of tallest buildings and structures in Bristol

References

Buildings and structures in Bristol